The Harry Perkins Institute of Medical Research is a medical research centre based in Perth, Western Australia. It has facilities at the Queen Elizabeth II Medical Centre in Nedlands and Fiona Stanley Hospital in Murdoch. The institute was established in 1998 as the Western Australian Institute for Medical Research (WAIMR), and was renamed in 2013 in honour of Harry Perkins, its founding chairman.

History
The Western Australian Institute for Medical Research (WAIMR) was established in 1998 as a collaboration between the University of Western Australia (UWA), Royal Perth Hospital, and Sir Charles Gairdner Hospital. Fremantle Hospital became a partner in 2003. The institute was an initiative of two UWA professors, Peter Klinken and Peter Leedman, with Klinken becoming its first director. Harry Perkins, the chairman of Wesfarmers, played a key role in its establishment and was appointed as the institute's first chairman, a position he held until his death in 2002. Wesfarmers provided an initial donation of $5 million, and has been the institute's major sponsor ever since. In October 2013, WAIMR changed its name to honour Perkins' legacy.

Facilities

The institute was originally housed in existing space at the Queen Elizabeth II Medical Centre. The new building (known as Perkins North) has a capacity of 750 researchers. It will accommodate up to 400 researchers.

References

External links

Medical research institutes in Western Australia
University of Western Australia
1998 establishments in Australia
Research institutes established in 1998